Aimee Richardson (born 29 December 1997) is a Northern Irish actress. She is best known for her role as Myrcella Baratheon in the first two seasons of the television series Game of Thrones (2011–2012).

Life and career

Early life
Richardson was born on 29 December 1997 in Bangor, County Down, Northern Ireland.

Acting career
Richardson's first major acting role was her portrayal of Georgina in romantic comedy Miss Conception in 2008.

In 2011, Richardson was cast to play princess Myrcella Baratheon in Game of Thrones.  After the first two seasons, her character was exiled in-universe and therefore did not appear in the third or fourth seasons.  At the 2014 San Diego Comic-Con, it was announced that the character was returning for the fifth season; however, the official cast list showed that the role had been recast to English actress Nell Tiger Free. HBO, the show's producers, offered no explanation for the decision.  Richardson responded by uploading a video to Vine depicting her sitting on a pavement with a princess crown and a sign saying "PRINCESS FOR HIRE".  The humorous reaction was received well by media sources, with The Daily Dot and The Radio Times describing it as "hilarious", and similar reactions from others. Business Insider, HuffPost and Insider Culture have noted that it is not uncommon for characters to be recast in Game of Thrones.  Free later said Richardson handled it "brilliantly" and in a "humble" manner.

Since appearing on Game of Thrones, Richardson has been cast for roles on several other television shows such as The Sparticle Mystery (2015), Storyland (2016) and My Mother and Other Strangers (2016).

Filmography

References

External links

 

1997 births
Living people
People from Bangor, County Down
Television actresses from Northern Ireland
Film actresses from Northern Ireland
21st-century actresses from Northern Ireland